Fannia mollissima is a species of fly in the family Fanniidae. It is found in the  Palearctic . For identification see

References

External links
Images representing Fannia mollissima at BOLD

Fanniidae
Insects described in 1840
Muscomorph flies of Europe